Le Brévent is a mountain of Haute-Savoie, France. It lies in the Aiguilles Rouges range of the French Prealps and has an altitude of  2525 metres (8,284 Feet) above sea level. This cliff is a popular spot for wingsuit flying down into the valley.

Mountains of Haute-Savoie
Mountains of the Alps